German submarine U-971 was a Type VIIC U-boat built for Nazi Germany's Kriegsmarine for service during World War II.
She was laid down on 15 June 1942 by Blohm & Voss, Hamburg as yard number 171, launched on 22 February 1943 and commissioned on 1 April 1943 under Oberleutnant zur See Walter Zeplien.

Design
German Type VIIC submarines were preceded by the shorter Type VIIB submarines. U-971 had a displacement of  when at the surface and  while submerged. She had two shafts and two  propellers.

U-971 was fitted with five  torpedo tubes (four fitted at the bow and one at the stern), fourteen torpedoes, one  SK C/35 naval gun, 220 rounds, and one twin  C/30 anti-aircraft gun. The vessel had a complement of between 44 and 60.

Service history
U-971 did not succeed in sinking or damaging any Allied ships.

On 24 June 1944 she was just west of the English Channel on her first patrol when she was depth charged by Liberator C Mk VI heavy bomber FL961/O of the Czechoslovak-manned No. 311 Squadron RAF and two s: the Royal Navy's  and Royal Canadian Navy's .

U-971 was sunk with the loss of one member of her crew. 51 men survived and were rescued.

References

Bibliography

1943 ships
German Type VIIC submarines
Maritime incidents in June 1944
Ships built in Hamburg
U-boats commissioned in 1943
U-boats sunk in 1944
U-boats sunk by British warships
U-boats sunk by Canadian warships
U-boats sunk by depth charges
World War II shipwrecks in the English Channel
World War II submarines of Germany